Oscar Morris Quitak (born 10 March 1926) is a British stage, film and television actor.

Quitak's stage work includes roles at the Old Vic and the National Theatre; as well as the original West End and Broadway productions of the musical Pickwick, in 1963 and 1965. His television credits include: Z-Cars, Man in a Suitcase, Doomwatch, Ace of Wands, Colditz, The Changes, The New Avengers, Open All Hours, Kessler as Josef Mengele, Chessgame, Howards' Way, A Very British Coup, Yes, Prime Minister, Saracen, Lovejoy and Telltale.

Personal life
Quitak lived in Ibiza with his wife of 62 years, the actress Andrée Melly, who died on 31 January 2020. The marriage produced two children.

Partial filmography
The Guinea Pig (1948) - David Tracey
It's Hard to Be Good (1948) - Man in Town Hall (uncredited)
Cairo Road (1950) - Bedouin Boy
The Dark Man (1951) - 2nd Reporter
Hell Is Sold Out (1951) - Jacques, waiter
So Little Time (1952) - Gerard
Something Money Can't Buy (1952) - 2nd Assistant director
Top of the Form (1953) - Septimus
The Crowded Day (1954) - Youth
The Colditz Story (1955) - Prisoner of War (uncredited)
The Prisoner (1955) - Cafe Waiter (uncredited)
Zarak (1956) - Youssuff
Town on Trial (1957) - David
The Traitor (1957) - Thomas Rilke
The Revenge of Frankenstein (1958) - Dwarf
Operation Amsterdam (1959) - Diamond Merchant
Red Monarch (1983) - Mekhlis
Bloodbath at the House of Death (1984) - Doctor
Brazil (1985) - Interview Official
Tangiers (1985) - Velatti
Code Name: Emerald (1985) - Army Doctor
Yes, Prime Minister (1986) - Chief Scientific Advisor
A Very British Coup (1988) - Government Chief Scientific Adviser

References

External links

1926 births
Living people
English male stage actors
English male film actors
English male television actors
20th-century English male actors